Mankera Tehsil , is an administrative subdivision, (tehsil), of Bhakkar District in the Punjab province of Pakistan. The town of Mankera is the headquarters of the tehsil.

Administration
The tehsil of Mankera is subdivided into 8 Union Councils.
Mankera 
Haiderabad Thall 
Mahni
Patti Bulanda
Gohar wala
Litan
Chak NO.6
Dhingan
 Karluwala village

References

Tehsils of Punjab, Pakistan
Bhakkar District